Ptilodexia rufipennis is a species of bristle fly in the family Tachinidae.

Distribution
Mexico.

References

Dexiinae
Insects described in 1844
Taxa named by Pierre-Justin-Marie Macquart
Diptera of North America